Speak Like a Child may refer to:

"Speak Like a Child" (song), a single by The Style Council
Speak Like a Child (album), an album by Herbie Hancock